Russian Embassy School in Washington, D.C. is a Russian overseas school in Washington, DC. The school was first established in 1957 and received its current name in 1996. The students are children of diplomats from Russia. It is operated by the Russian Ministry of Foreign Affairs and it serves elementary school through senior high school.

See also
Russia–United States relations

Anglo-American-Canadian international schools in Russia:
 Anglo-American School of Moscow
 Anglo-American School of St. Petersburg

References

External links
  

Private K-12 schools in Washington, D.C.
Washington, D.C.
Preparatory schools in Washington, D.C.
Russia–United States relations
Soviet Union–United States relations
International schools in Washington, D.C.
1957 establishments in Washington, D.C.
Educational institutions established in 1957
Russian-American culture in Washington, D.C.